Salvadora may refer to:
 Salvadora Medina Onrubia (1894-1972), Argentine poet, anarchist, feminist
 Salvadora (snake), a genus of patchnose snakes in the family Colubridae
 Salvadora (plant), a genus of flowering plants in the family Salvadoraceae